NGC 6041 is a giant elliptical galaxy located about 470 million light-years away in the constellation Hercules. NGC 6041 has an extended envelope that is distorted towards the galaxy pair Arp 122. NGC 6041 is the brightest galaxy (BCG) in the Hercules Cluster.  The galaxy was discovered by astronomer Édouard Stephan on June 27, 1870.

See also
 List of NGC objects (6001–7000)
 Messier 87 
 NGC 1399
 NGC 4874
 NGC 4889

References

External links

Hercules (constellation)
Elliptical galaxies
6041
056962
10170
Astronomical objects discovered in 1870
Hercules Cluster
Discoveries by Édouard Stephan